Jared Paul Mortensen (born June 1, 1988) is a Canadian professional baseball pitcher who is a free agent.

Career
Mortensen played college baseball at Mount Olive College and the Louisiana State University in Shreveport. After going undrafted in the 2012 Major League Baseball draft, he signed with the Grand Prairie AirHogs of the American Association of Independent Professional Baseball. Later in the year, he signed a minor league contract with the Tampa Bay Rays.

In 2017, Mortensen signed with the Texas AirHogs of the American Association of Independent Professional Baseball.

On January 10, 2018, Mortensen was traded to the Sugar Land Skeeters of the Atlantic League of Professional Baseball. He was released on April 24, 2018.

On May 2, 2018, Mortensen signed with the Cleburne Railroaders of the American Association. He was traded to the Kansas City T-Bones on August 15, 2018.

On March 27, 2019, Mortensen was traded to the Ottawa Champions of the Can-Am League.

On March 24, 2020, Mortensen signed with the Welland Jackfish of the Intercounty Baseball League.

In 2021, he was a pitcher for the Équipe Québec of the independent Frontier League. In the regular season, he started 4 games, went 22 innings with a 5.72 ERA, a 1.36 WHIP and 22 strikeouts. In the postseason, he started 1 game and allowed no runs through 7 innings, threw 8 strikeouts, and allowed 2 walks and 2 hits. On December 13, 2021, the Capitales declined the option on Mortensen for the 2022 season and he became a free agent.

International career
In 2015, Mortensen was selected to play for the Canada national baseball team at the Pan American Games.

On January 9, 2019, he was selected  at the 2019 Pan American Games Qualifier.

References

External links

1988 births
Living people
Baseball people from British Columbia
Baseball pitchers
Baseball players at the 2015 Pan American Games
Canada national baseball team players
Canadian expatriate baseball players in the United States
Charlotte Stone Crabs players
Cleburne Railroaders players
Durham Bulls players
Fresno Grizzlies players
Grand Prairie AirHogs players
Kansas City T-Bones players
Leones del Escogido players
Canadian expatriate baseball players in the Dominican Republic
Louisiana State University Shreveport alumni
Montgomery Biscuits players
Mount Olive Trojans baseball players
Navegantes del Magallanes players
Canadian expatriate baseball players in Venezuela
Ottawa Champions players
Pan American Games gold medalists for Canada
Pan American Games medalists in baseball
Sportspeople from Abbotsford, British Columbia
Texas AirHogs players
2015 WBSC Premier12 players
Medalists at the 2015 Pan American Games